Boule d'Or was a Belgian professional cycling team that existed from 1979 to 1983. Its main sponsor was cigarette brand Boule d'Or.

References

Cycling teams based in Belgium
Defunct cycling teams based in Belgium
1979 establishments in Belgium
1983 disestablishments in Belgium
Cycling teams established in 1979
Cycling teams disestablished in 1983